Roy Hirabayashi (born 1951) is a leader in North American Taiko. He is a composer, performer, teacher and activist. He is co-founder of one of the seminal taiko groups in North America, San Jose Taiko, the group's former Artistic and Executive Director, and active in developing San Jose's Japantown and arts community.

He and his wife PJ are recipients of the 2011 National Heritage Fellowship awarded by the National Endowment for the Arts, which is the United States' highest honor in the folk and traditional arts.

Early life
Roy Hirabayashi was born in Berkeley, California in 1951. His parents were also born in the United States (kibei); however, they were sent to Japan as young children where they adopted Japanese culture and traditions.

Roy grew up in east Oakland, California and was active in the Oakland Buddhist Temple where he and his family worshiped. Roy's first introduction to the taiko drum was at the temple's summer Obon Festival.

Hirabayashi attended San Jose State beginning in 1969. At the time, San Jose State was a mecca for anti-war protests. So much, in fact, that the school was in constant threat of being shut down due to strikes by teachers and students alike. This inspired Roy to learn more about his roots as a Japanese-American. Hirabayashi became interested in the social sciences and worked in the Asian American studies program at San Jose State.

San Jose Taiko
In 1973, Reverend Abiko recruited Dean Miyakusu and Hirabayashi to begin a taiko program through their Buddhist temple. They were inspired by Kinnara Taiko in Los Angeles They decided they wanted to involve the kids in the community in taiko and enlisted Roy Hirabayashi's support. Roy also invited his peers and under his leadership the program took off.

In July and August 1973, after Roy began a fundraiser for the group, Roy and Dean Miyakusu went to Los Angeles to meet Reverend Kodani of Kinnara Taiko and learn more about running a taiko group. Reverend Kodani set them up with some drums and taught them how to make their own drums. The drum building techniques Roy learned from Kinnara, and then honed with his own taiko group, provided San Jose Taiko a financially plausible way to build their drum ensemble and grow as a group.

In October, just two months after visiting L.A. and Reverend Kodani, San Jose Taiko finished building their own drum set and creating their own songs and they had their first performance. The following summer, during the San Jose Buddhist Church Obon festival, Roy Hirabayashi met Seiichi Tanaka, the founder of San Francisco Taiko Dojo, the first North American Taiko group. Tanaka offered the San Jose Taiko members an opportunity to engage in his own group's workshops. For a period of time, San Jose Taiko group members drove up to San Francisco to study with Seiichi Tanaka. After about a year, however, the group decided to continue and strengthen their own unique identity and concluded their study with San Francisco Taiko.

Roy is particularly known for using taiko to establish Japanese Americans as strong individuals. Inspired by the nationwide civil rights movement, Roy saw the powerful sound of the drum as a means to combat the stereotype of Japanese Americans as quiet and meek. Additionally, the prevalence of woman taiko players in San Jose Taiko modelled equality along gender lines for female spectators.

In 1977, Ondekoza visited Los Angeles on their tour of the U.S. and Roy and San Jose Taiko members went to see their performance. In the following year, Ondekoza came to San Jose for a performance and extended stay. It was during this time that San Jose Taiko had an opportunity to learn more about the life style of Ondekoza and established many lifelong friendships with the individual members.

Kodo
Unfortunately, Ondekoza had an organizational division. Mr. Tagayasu Den created a new Ondekoza in the Nagasaki area and the former members of company formed Kodo. When Kodo, was about to launch their first North American tour in the fall of 1982, they ask Roy to join the tour as the tour and stage manager. He began working with Kodo in August 1982 and then returned to Japan with the group after the U.S. tour was complete. There he had the opportunity to experience the rigorous training of the group and their polished professional presentation. Impressed by Kodo's dedication and success, Hirabayashi returned to San Jose with a broader vision for San Jose Taiko.

Arts development

San Jose Taiko first started under the name San Jose Taiko Group. Roy established San Jose Taiko as a 501(c)(3) nonprofit before he left with Kodo to Japan. Two years later, in 1983, the group received its first City of San Jose Fine Arts Commission Grant. With the grant money, San Jose Taiko moved into their first rehearsal space and went on their first tour. The following year San Jose Taiko began their first junior taiko class. In 1985, San Jose Taiko (SJT) hired a part-time general manager, the first staff member for SJT. In 1989, San Jose Taiko impressed a management company, California Artists Management, and SJT soon signed on with the booking management company.

California Artists Management worked on establishing SJT internationally and finding concert opportunities for the group. Roy took a back seat and learned how to mold his group's identity and gain exposure from a professional. SJT engaged the Arts Council of Santa Clara County and worked with their Music and Arts Campaign to develop SJT's first individual donor base. Roy shifted over to become the managing director of SJT, focusing on fundraising and fiscal development and eventually became the Executive Director of the organization.

Hirabayashi has dedicated years to developing SJT and is now working on the sustainability of the group. He trained staff members (the group now has five full and part-time staff members) and extending the current model of SJT to ensure its long term success. In July 2011, Roy and PJ (Artistic Director) stepped down from the positions to turn over the organization to Wisa Uemura as the Executive Director and Franco Imperial as the Artistic Director.

Roy is also active in fostering and developing other artistic leaders. He helped found 1st ACT's Multicultural Arts Leadership Institute which strives to train artistic leaders in the Silicon Valley area on how to engage their community and strengthen their business management skills. The programs provides participants opportunities to network, develop fundraising strategies, and hone their problem solving skills.

References

Living people
1951 births
Taiko players
National Heritage Fellowship winners
American people of Japanese descent